City Market in Raleigh is a market located in Raleigh, North Carolina, United States. It was founded in October, 1914. It became known as a historic place when Raleigh City Council secured a grant from the North Carolina Division of Archives & History to study the architectural resources surrounding Moore Square, in 1980. It is one of the major tourist attractions in Raleigh. In early May, 2008, the market was the location of an art project unveiling by the Visual Art Exchange.<ref name="Raleigh Chronicle">{{cite web |url=http://www.raleigh2.com/default.asp?sourceid=&smenu=1&twindow=&mad=&sdetail=816&wpage=1&skeyword=&sidate=&ccat=&ccatm=&restate=&restatus=&reoption=&retype=&repmin=&repmax=&rebed=&rebath=&subname=&pform=&sc=2502&hn=raleigh2&he=.com |archive-url=https://archive.today/20130201054058/http://www.raleigh2.com/default.asp?sourceid=&smenu=1&twindow=&mad=&sdetail=816&wpage=1&skeyword=&sidate=&ccat=&ccatm=&restate=&restatus=&reoption=&retype=&repmin=&repmax=&rebed=&rebath=&subname=&pform=&sc=2502&hn=raleigh2&he=.com |url-status=dead |archive-date=2013-02-01 |title=The Raleigh Chronicle'''s report on the public art show in the City Market of Raleigh, North Carolina |publisher=The Raleigh Chronicle |date=2008-04-28 |accessdate=2008-05-16 }}</ref> The market hosts a monthly festival, called First Friday, on the first Friday of every month.

History
City Market in Raleigh was built on October 1, 1914. The architect for the project was Wayne County native James Matthew Kennedy. The market flourished until the advent of supermarkets in the 1950s which led to its demise. Joe Hakan and his son purchased and upgraded the place in the 1990s and it prospered again.

Sources

City Market's official website
www.visitraleigh.com

Further readingThe 1914 City Market at Moore Square in Raleigh, NC.'' Published, 1989 OCLC: 32127888

Retail markets in the United States
Shopping malls in Raleigh, North Carolina
Shopping malls established in 1914
1914 establishments in North Carolina